Prabodh Tirkey (born 6 October 1984) is an Indian hockey midfielder. He is a former captain of the Indian hockey team.

Personal life
Prabodh is the younger brother of the Indian hockey player Ignace Tirkey, who also has captained the Indian Senior Team. His idol is another Indian ex-captain and one of the best defenders in world hockey, Dilip Tirkey, who comes from the same town of Sundergarh. He married Sweta Tirkey at Ranchi on 28 January 2011.

Career
In his early career he was the national captain of sub-junior, junior and India-A team and finally became the India senior team captain. He was in the Indian team which won the 2007 Asia Cup in Chennai.

Awards
2001 Ekalavya Puraskar
2009 Biju Patnaik State Sports Award

References

1984 births
Field hockey players from Odisha
Field hockey players at the 2006 Commonwealth Games
Living people
Indian Christians
Asian Games medalists in field hockey
World Series Hockey players
Field hockey players at the 2010 Asian Games
Indian male field hockey players
Asian Games bronze medalists for India
Commonwealth Games competitors for India
Medalists at the 2010 Asian Games
2006 Men's Hockey World Cup players